Asad Malik is a Pakistani actor, film director and Film producer. He gained fame by 1990s and early 2000, after acting for PTV and NTM. he started his career as a film actor in 1989. His debut performance on television was the classic NTM drama 'Dasht' in the year 1993. It was numerous hit, and he impressed the viewers by this searial. In the same year he performed in a PTV drama 'Doosra Asmaan' which was the first Pakistani drama shot outside Pakistan. After that he worked in many hit dramas on PTV as like 'Janey Anjaney', 'Aansoo' and 'Niqab (TV series)'. Asad's other PTV Plays was 'Moum', 'Hawa, Rait Aur Angan' and 'Aurat Ka Ghar Konsa'.he has also worked for much of drama serials on private channels as 'Angoori' (ATV), 'Buri Aurat' (Geo TV), 'Kaisi Yeh Deewangi' (Hum TV), 'Larkiyan Mohallay Ki' (Hum TV), 'Adhoori Film Ki Puri Kahani' (ATV) and 'Dil Moti Ke Mole' (ATV), 'Manzil' (ARY Digital), 'Ali Ki Ammi' (Geo TV), 'Dhani' (Geo TV), 'Meherbaan' (A Plus Entertainment) among many others.

Early life and education
Asad Malik is a Pakistani actor and model.
The eldest of four siblings, with one brother who died in 2000, another settled in Lahore and a sister in Canada, he has been educated in the Crescent Model School, Lahore.

Television

References

External links
 
 Asad Malik on Facebook

Year of birth missing (living people)
Living people
Pakistani male film actors
Pakistani male television actors
Male actors from Lahore
Punjabi people